Vagner Gonçalves may refer to:
 Vagner Gonçalves (Cape Verdean footballer)
 Vagner Gonçalves (Brazilian footballer)